Obioha is a surname. Notable people with the surname include:

Julien Obioha (born 1994), American football player